Jo Ann Gibson Robinson (April 17, 1912 – August 29, 1992) was an activist during the Civil Rights Movement and educator in Montgomery, Alabama.

Early life
Born Jo Ann Gibson, near Culloden, Georgia, on April 17, 1912, she was the youngest of twelve children. Her parents were Owen Boston and Dollie Webb Gibson, who had owned a farm. Her father died when Robinson was only 6 years old. After her father's death, Robinson, her mother, and her eleven other siblings moved to Macon, Georgia. Robinson excelled in school and earned valedictorian at her high school in her graduating year. She became the first person in her family to graduate from college, attending Fort Valley State College.

Career and college
Robinson graduated from Fort Valley State College with her Bachelor's degree in 1934. After college, she became a public school teacher in Macon, where she was married to Wilbur Robinson for a short time. Five years later, she went to Atlanta, where she earned an M.A. in English at Atlanta University. Robinson continued her education even after earning her Masters at New York's Columbia University, and continued to study English. Shortly after, she went to teach at Mary Allen College. After teaching in Texas, she then accepted a position at Alabama State College (now Alabama State University) in Montgomery.

Women's Political Council (WPC)
 It was in Montgomery, Alabama, where Robinson joined the Women's Political Council, which Mary Fair Burks had founded three years earlier. The WPC was an organization dedicated to inspiring African Americans to rise above the level of mediocrity that they had been conditioned to accept, to fight juvenile delinquency, increase voter registration in the African American community, and to improve their status as a group. The WPC was also in the development in women's involvement in civic affairs, worked towards encouraging African Americans to vote, and helping women who were victims of rape.

Segregation on Montgomery buses
In 1949, Robinson was verbally attacked by a bus driver for sitting in the front “Whites only” section of the bus. The whites-only section was empty say for one person 2 rows infront of her. Out of fear that the incident would escalate and that the driver would go from verbal abuse to physical, Robinson left the bus. Her response to the incident was to attempt to start a protest boycott against bus segregation in Alabama.  However, when Robinson approached fellow WPC members with her story and proposal, she was told that it was “a fact of life in Montgomery.”  In late 1950, she succeeded Burks as president of the WPC and helped focus the group's efforts on bus abuses. To further her efforts, Robinson met with the mayor of Montgomery at the time, William A. Gayle. Robinson met with City Hall's council, but they were not interested in what she had to say. When City Hall's leaders were no help, Robinson took matters into her own hands and organized a boycott once again. Robinson was an outspoken critic of the treatment of African Americans on public transportation. She was also active in the Dexter Avenue Baptist Church.
 
The WPC made complaints about the bus seating to the Montgomery City Commission and about abusive drivers and achieved some concessions, including an undertaking that drivers would be courteous, and having buses stop at every corner in Black neighborhoods as they did in white areas.

After Brown vs. Board of Education (1954), Robinson informed the mayor of the city that a boycott would come. After Rosa Parks' arrest, they seized the moment to plan the Montgomery bus boycott.

On Thursday, December 1, 1955, Rosa Parks was arrested for refusing to move from her seat in the black area of the bus she was traveling on to make way for a white passenger who was standing. Parks, a civil rights organizer, had intended to instigate a reaction from white citizens and authorities. That night, with Parks' permission, Robinson stayed up mimeographing 35,000 handbills calling for a boycott of the Montgomery bus system, with the help of the chairman of the Alabama State College business department, John Cannon, and two students. The boycott was supported and fought by many. In a 1976 interview, Robinson pointed out, “That boycott was not supported by a few people; it was supported by 52,000 people”. The boycott was initially planned for just the following Monday.  Robinson passed out the leaflets at a Friday afternoon meeting of AME Zionist clergy, among other places, and Reverend L. Roy Bennett requested other ministers attend a meeting that Friday night and to urge their congregations to take part in the boycott. Robinson, Reverend Ralph David Abernathy, two of her senior students and other WPC members then passed out the handbills to high school students leaving school that afternoon.

After the success of the one-day boycott, Black citizens decided to continue the boycott and established the Montgomery Improvement Association to focus their efforts. The Reverend Martin Luther King Jr. was elected president.  Robinson never became a member of this group. She had declined an official position to the Montgomery Improvement Association because of her teaching position at Alabama State.  She served on its executive board and edited their newsletter, at King's request. Behind the scenes, Robinson also helped in carpooling African Americans to work. She was so involved King took notice in his memoir of the boycott, Stride Towards Freedom. Dr. King said of Robinson, "Apparently indefatigable, she, perhaps more than any other person, was active on every level of protest". In order to protect her position at Alabama State College, and to protect her colleagues, Robinson purposely stayed out of the limelight, even though she worked diligently with the MIA. Robinson and other WPC members also helped sustain the boycott by providing transportation for boycotters.

Robinson was the target of several acts of intimidation. Robinson was arrested many times. In February 1956, a local police officer threw a stone through the window of her house. Then two weeks later, another police officer poured acid on her car. The violence was so bad that the governor of Alabama ordered the state police to guard the houses of the boycott leaders. The boycott lasted over a year because the bus company would not give in to the demands of the protesters. On December 20, 1956, the boycotts finally ended after the federal district court deemed segregated seating was unconstitutional. However, Robinson fought hard and took great pride in the eventual success of the boycott. In her memoir, Robinson wrote, "An oppressed but brave people, whose pride and dignity rose to the occasion, conquered fear, and faced whatever perils had to be confronted. The boycott was the most beautiful memory that all of us who participated will carry to our final resting place." The Montgomery bus boycott broke through and gave real hope as it helped to inspire other protests because of its success and, of course, lead to many protests with the importance of nonviolence that MLK preached. After a student sit-in in early 1960, Robinson and other teachers who supported the students resigned their positions at Alabama State College. Robinson left Alabama State College and moved out of Montgomery that year. She taught at Grambling College in Louisiana for one year then moved to Los Angeles and taught English in the public school system. In Los Angeles, she continued to be active in local women's organizations. Robinson taught in the LA schools until she retired from teaching in 1976. Robinson was strongly against discrimination. Robinson inspired many young women to join the protest and to fight. Robinson said, "Women's leadership was no less important to the development of the Montgomery Bus Boycott than was the male and minister-dominated leadership."

Robinson's memoir, The Montgomery Bus Boycott and the Women Who Started It, edited by David J. Garrow, was published in 1987 by the University of Tennessee Press.

Legacy
In 2021, the Georgia Historical Society erected a historical marker for The Birthplace of Jo Ann Gibson Robinson in Monroe County, Georgia.

On September 17, 2021, the Alabama State University board of trustees voted unanimously to name a residence hall after Robinson. The naming ceremony took place in April 2022.

Personal life 
Robinson was a member of The Links.

See also 
 Claudette Colvin
 List of civil rights leaders

References

Sources
Abernathy Ralph David (1989), And The Walls Came Tumbling Down, Harper & Row, Publishers, New York page 138

Bibliography 
 Robinson, Jo Ann Gibson and David J Garrow. The Montgomery Bus Boycott and the Women Who Started It: The Memoir of Jo Ann Gibson Robinson. Knoxville: University of Tennessee Press, 1987.
  “Jo Ann Robinson.” Biography.com, A&E Networks Television, 15 Apr. 2019, www.biography.com/activist/jo-ann-robinson.
 “Jo Ann Robinson: A Heroine of the Montgomery Bus Boycott.” National Museum of African American History and Culture, 15 Mar. 2018, nmaahc.si.edu/blog-post/jo-ann-robinson-heroine-montgomery-bus-boycott.
 “Robinson, Jo Ann Gibson.” The Martin Luther King, Jr., Research and Education Institute, 5 Apr. 2018, kinginstitute.stanford.edu/encyclopedia/robinson-jo-ann-gibson.

External links
  Jo Ann Gibson Robinson was an unsung activist! in The African American Registry

  The Birthplace of Jo Ann Gibson Robinson (1912-1992) in the Georgia Historical Society's historical marker database

1912 births
1992 deaths
Activists for African-American civil rights
History of civil rights in the United States
Fort Valley State University alumni
Clark Atlanta University alumni
Montgomery bus boycott